is a Japanese manga created by Naoto Tsushima. It was a monthly serialized super robot manga continuing the Getter Robo mythos by way of the titular Getter Robo Hien. A total of 15 chapters were published the 28th of every month in Magna, a low-resolution free webcomic, only to be printed in higher quality in tankōbon volumes collecting five chapters each.

Plot
Taking place after Getter Robo Go and before Getter Ark, The series features an older Hayato, one of the original pilots of Getter Robo, who leads a new team of 3 youngsters who pilot a new machine: Getter Robo Hien. Together, they face an army of plant monsters led by evil Professor Jacov. Jacov seeks to eradicate all human life, because he believes plants are the rightful heirs to the Earth because getter rays influenced their evolution long before humans even existed.

Characters

Saotome Research Institute
 
The Head of the Saotome Institute and ex-pilot of Getter. He currently manages the institute after Prof. Saotome's disappearance.

Getter Team
 
 Pilot of Getter Hien 1, he is the only survivor of D-City when his father and the friend were killed from the mysterious plant attacks. It excels in mechanic's manipulation, and it has the ability to turn parts of its body willingly into firearm-like weapons. The one's first campaign was decorated with mastering the control method of the first machine taken for the first time only by looking over the manual data for a short time, and subjugating father's enmity. He was then trained for a week and permanently became the main member of the Getter Team.
 
 Pilot of Getter Hien 2, the Jakofu killed her parents. Her white hair is from the shock of losing her parents at such a young age. They died right before her very eyes.
 
 Pilot of Getter Hien 3.

American Army
 : Excalibur's Main Pilot.

Enemies
 : A mad scientist focused on world conquest.he seems to  know when his creatures are killed.
 : Professor Jacov's son.

Mechanics

Getter Robo Hien

Getter 1
Attacks
Getter Tomahawk: A gigantic twin-bladed axe, and Getter-1's main melee weapon.
Plasma Nova: A giant plasma beam from the twin cannons inside Getter-1's shoulders.

Getter 2
Attacks
Getter Drill

Getter 3
Attacks
Napalm Rain: Getter-3 launches an endless flurry of missiles launched from his arms, fingers, and many other spots.
:

Old Getter Robo

Excalibur
 is a Super Robot from the United States. It has an aerodynamic form and a humanoid form.

Humanoid form
Attacks
Justice: the Statue of Liberty changes form and becomes a giant beam cannon wielded by Excalibur.
Maximum Thunder:

Aerodynamic form

Excalibur II
 is a Super Robot from the United States. It has an aerodynamic form and a humanoid form.

Humanoid form
Attacks
Cross Judgement:

Aerodynamic form

References

External links
 Gentosha Comics
 Magna, Gentosha's Webcomic which publishes Hien

Manga series
Getter Robo
Shōnen manga
Super robot anime and manga
Japanese webcomics
Webcomics in print
Gentosha manga